Progress M-47, identified by NASA as Progress 10P, was a Progress spacecraft used to resupply the International Space Station. It was a Progress-M 11F615A55 spacecraft, with the serial number 247.

Launch
Progress M-47 was launched by a Soyuz-U carrier rocket from Site 1/5 at the Baikonur Cosmodrome. Launch occurred at 12:59:40 GMT on 2 February 2003.

Docking
The spacecraft docked with the aft port of the Zvezda module at 14:49:04 UTC on 4 February 2003. It remained docked for almost 204 days before undocking at 22:48:08 UTC on 27 August 2003. to make way for Progress M-48 It was deorbited at 01:49 UTC the next day. The spacecraft burned up in the atmosphere over the Pacific Ocean, with any remaining debris landing in the ocean at around 02:37:46 UTC.

Progress M-47 carried supplies to the International Space Station, including food, water and oxygen for the crew and equipment for conducting scientific research. It was the first spacecraft to launch to the International Space Station following the loss of the  the day prior to the Progress module's launch, which resulted in a suspension of Shuttle flights to the Station.

See also

 List of Progress flights
Uncrewed spaceflights to the International Space Station

References

Spacecraft launched in 2003
Progress (spacecraft) missions
Supply vehicles for the International Space Station
Spacecraft launched by Soyuz-U rockets
Spacecraft which reentered in 2003